Noli Me Tangere is a large sculptural arrangement that forms part of the Alaleona Chapel in the church of Santi Domenico e Sisto, in Rome.

The architecutal outline of the chapel was designed by the Italian artist Gianlorenzo Bernini. The sculpture, which shows Jesus responding to Mary Magdalene with the words 'Do not touch me' upon her recognition of him following the Resurrection, was also designed by Bernini and carried out by his pupil Antonio Raggi, probably from 1649 to 1652.

Preparatory Work 
A wash drawing exists in the Uffizi Gallery, Florence, that shows the overall design, although it appears that Raggi made some changes to the sculptural group.

Patronage 
The chapel was commissioned by Sister Maria Eleonora Alaleona. It is suspected that it was commissioned as an act of penitence for the behaviour of an unnamed relative of hers in 1636 - a nun who had tried to smuggle a lover into her convent only for the lover to suffocate to death in the chest he was hiding in. The donation made was 3,000 Roman scudi (around US$120,000 in contemporary costs.)

See also 
List of works by Gian Lorenzo Bernini

References
Notes

Bibliography

External links
 

1640s sculptures
1650s sculptures
Marble sculptures in Italy
Sculptures by Gian Lorenzo Bernini
Statues of Jesus
Statues depicting Mary Magdalene